The Roman Catholic Diocese of Subotica is a diocese of the Roman Catholic Church in Serbia. It is subject to the Roman Catholic Archdiocese of Belgrade. The Diocese is centered in the city of Subotica.

Territory
The Diocese of Subotica encompasses the Serbian part of the Bačka region, which is situated in the Autonomous Province of Vojvodina.

The diocese's cathedral is the Cathedral of Saint Teresa of Avila in Subotica, dating back to 1779.

The diocese is multi-ethnic and has members primarily from the sizable Hungarian, Croat and Bunjevci communities, among others.

History
Until the end of First World War, the territory of the present-day Diocese of Subotica belonged to the Roman Catholic Archdiocese of Kalocsa. After the collapse of Austria-Hungary, region of Southern Bačka was incorporated into newly formed Kingdom of Serbs, Croats and Slovenes (later known as Yugoslavia). On 10 February 1923, the Apostolic Administration of Yugoslav Bačka was created. Before the end of Second World War, there was a sizable number of Roman Catholic Germans in the region of Bačka. On 25 January 1968, apostolic administration was elevated into the rank of diocese as "Diocese of Subotica". In 1986, it was placed under metropolitan jurisdiction of Roman Catholic Archbishop of Belgrade.

From the middle 1980s, and especially during the 1990s, number of Catholics in the territory of this diocese decreased due to various reasons, including low birth rates among local Roman Catholics, economic emigration, and ethnic tensions of the Yugoslav wars.

Administrators and bishops

Apostolic Administrators of Jugoslavenska Bačka
(1923–1958) Lajčo Budanović, since 1927 as titular bishop of Cisamus
(1958–1968) Matija Zvekanović, titular bishop of Burca

Diocesan Bishops
(1968–1989) Matija Zvekanović 
(1989–2020) János Pénzes 
(2020–2022) Slavko Večerin

Auxiliary bishop
(1955–1958) Matija Zvekanović, titular bishop of Burca

Education
The diocese runs the only Catholic high school in the country, the Paulinum gymnasium.

Press 
Hitélet is the oldest Roman Catholic monthly magazine of the diocese in Hungarian, founded by László Huzsvár, the later bishop of Zrenjanin.

Hírviviő is the weekly Roman Catholic magazine of the diocese in Hungarian.

Zvonik is a Roman Catholic magazine founded by Croat priests from Roman Catholic Diocese of Subotica. It's being published in Croatian.

Notable individuals
Blessed Mary of Jesus Crucified Petković solicited for help in this Diocese and founded children's homes (for poor and abandoned children) and monasteries of her Order, Order of Daughters of Mercy.

See also
 Ivan Antunović

External links
Bishopric of Subotica

Subotica
Subotica
Bačka
Subotica